Kim Kyung-nam (born December 21, 1989) is a South Korean actor. He is best known for his roles in the television series Prison Playbook (2017–2018), Come and Hug Me (2018), Where Stars Land (2018), Special Labor Inspector (2019), The King: Eternal Monarch (2020), and Revolutionary Sisters (2021).

Filmography

Film

Television series

Discography

Singles

Awards and nominations

References

External links 
 
 

1989 births
Living people
South Korean male film actors
South Korean male stage actors
South Korean male television actors
21st-century South Korean male actors
Male actors from Seoul